Laurent Jacobelli (born 13 October 1969) is a French politician. In 2022, he was elected member of the National Assembly as a member of the National Rally for Moselle's 8th constituency.

Early life 
Jacobelli was born on 13 October 1969 in Thiais. He is of Italian descent. He graduated from the ESSEC Business School in 1992 and from the ESCP in 1993.

Career 
Jacobelli worked as an audiovisual manager for TV5 and served as head of TV5's programs from 2005 to 2008. Between 2009 and 2013 he worked as an executive for the Zodiak Kids Studios channel. He then founded his own television production company, Sunny Prod.

He has also served as a reservist in the French Navy.

Politics 

He joined Nicolas Dupont-Aignan in 2014 before signing up for regional elections in December 2015 in the Grand Est.

On 19 May 2017, Jacobelli left France Arise. In June 2017, he was the FN candidate in the 10th constituency of Bouches-du-Rhône (21.88% in the 1st round, 41.73% in the second round).

In November 2017 he was appointed head of communication for the National Rally.

See also 

 List of deputies of the 16th National Assembly of France

References

External links 
 

1969 births
Living people
French people of Italian descent
People from Thiais
National Rally (France) politicians
Politicians from Île-de-France
Candidates for the 2017 French legislative election
French politicians
Deputies of the 16th National Assembly of the French Fifth Republic
ESSEC Business School alumni
Members of Parliament for Moselle